ALM Évreux Basket is a French professional basketball club based in Evreux, France. The team plays in the LNB Pro B, the French second division.

Season by season

Notable players

 Isaia Cordinier
 Joseph Gomis
 Filipe da Silva
 Ruphin Kayembe-Tshiabu
 Kenny Atkinson
 Bruce Bowen
 Joe Burton (basketball)
 Samme Givens
 Jeremiah Wood
 Frank Aron Booker

External links
Eurobasket.com Team Page

Basketball teams established in 1962
Evreux
Sport in France